The 2017 BRD Bucharest Open was a professional tennis tournament played on red clay courts. It was the 4th edition of the tournament and part of the 2017 WTA Tour. It took place at Arenele BNR in Bucharest, Romania between 17 and 24 July 2017.

Points and prize money

Point distribution

Prize money

Singles main-draw entrants

Seeds 

 1 Rankings as of 3 July 2017.

Other entrants 
The following players received wildcards into the main draw:
  Irina Bara
  Jaqueline Cristian
  Elena-Gabriela Ruse

The following players received entry using a protected ranking:
  Alexa Glatch
  Polona Hercog

The following players received entry from the qualifying draw:
  Alexandra Dulgheru 
  Magdalena Fręch
  Sesil Karatantcheva
  Arantxa Rus

The following player received entry as a lucky loser:
  Lesley Kerkhove

Withdrawals
Before the tournament
 Anna Blinkova →replaced by  Nadia Podoroska
 Océane Dodin →replaced by  Çağla Büyükakçay
 Ons Jabeur →replaced by  Quirine Lemoine
 Kristína Kučová →replaced by  Polona Hercog
 Varvara Lepchenko →replaced by  Alexa Glatch
 Christina McHale →replaced by  Kateryna Kozlova
 Monica Niculescu →replaced by  Lesley Kerkhove
 Yulia Putintseva →replaced by  Barbora Krejčíková

Retirements
 Nadia Podoroska

Doubles main-draw entrants

Seeds 

 1 Rankings as of July 3, 2017.

Other entrants 
The following pairs received wildcards into the main draw:
  Georgia Crăciun /  Alexandra Dulgheru
  Jaqueline Cristian /  Cristina Dinu

The following pair received entry as alternates:
  Nicoleta Dascălu /  Isabella Shinikova

Withdrawals 
Before the tournament
  Fanny Stollár

Champions

Singles 

  Irina-Camelia Begu def.  Julia Görges, 6–3, 7–5

Doubles 

  Irina-Camelia Begu /  Raluca Olaru def.  Elise Mertens /  Demi Schuurs, 6–3, 6–3

References

External links 
 
 

BRD Bucharest Open
BRD Bucharest Open
2017 in Romanian tennis
July 2017 sports events in Romania